Spur 399 is a short, limited-access spur highway located in Collin County, Texas, and connects State Highway 121 (SH 121) and the US Highway 75 (US 75, Central Expressway) to SH 5, in McKinney. The highway is just over a mile long, and was originally designated in 1964, but was redesignated in 1989.

Route description
Spur 399 begins where SH 121 branches off the Sam Rayburn Tollway, to merge with the Central Expressway. After the interchange, the highway passes a few empty commercial building lots, before passing the Collin Higher Education Center to the north, and the Medical Center of McKinney to the south. The frontage roads then, depending on the direction, merge or exit the highway. The road passes a small field, before reaching its eastern terminus, an at-grade intersection with SH 5. The freeway portion of the highway contains only one exit, for US 75 south, from the eastbound lanes, but the highway's frontage roads give access to and receive access from both directions of the Central Expressway.

History
Spur 399 was designated on May 4, 1964 from US 75 to SH 5. On March 2, 1989, it was transferred to SH 121, and Spur 399 was reused for old SH 121 instead.

Junction list

See also

References

399
Transportation in Collin County, Texas